The central odontogenic fibroma is a rare benign odontogenic tumor.  It is more common in adults, with the average age being 40.  It is twice as likely to affect women than men. It is usually found either in the anterior maxilla or the posterior mandible. Radiographically it presents with either radiolucency or mixed radiolucency/opaque.  The simple type is characterized by delicate fibrillar stroma of collagen containing fibroblasts; the WHO type is characterized by more mature fibrillar stroma of collagen.  Treatment is by surgical removal

References

 Kahn, Michael A. Basic Oral and Maxillofacial Pathology. Volume 1. 2001.

Odontogenic tumors